Arabs in Italy are Italian residents of Arab heritage.

According to the Italian National Institute of Statistics (ISTAT), most Arab non-Italian citizens residing in Italy come from North Africa, most notably from Morocco, Egypt, Tunisia and Algeria. Other notable countries of origin include Somalia, Syria, Iraq, Lebanon, Libya, Sudan, Jordan and Palestine.

As a result of mixed marriages and naturalization, many Arabs in Italy are Italian nationals or second-generation children of expatriates. Between 2008 and 2020, almost 340,000 people from Arab-speaking countries acquired Italian citizenship. As Italy doesn't collect data based on ethnicity it is not possible to know the actual number of Italians with Arab ancestry.

History 
In the 9th century AD, Arabs settled in mass in the island of Sicily and formed the Emirate of Sicily under Islamic rule. During this period, there were several attempts to invade mainland Italy, with the Emirate of Bari being one of the most notable examples. Arabs have significantly impacted the genetics of the Island of Sicily as well as neighboring areas.

Population

Notable people

See also

 Arab diaspora
 Arabs in Europe
 History of Islam in southern Italy
 Muslim conquest of Sicily
 Saracinesco

References

 
African diaspora in Italy
Asian diaspora in Italy
Italian people of Arab descent
Ethnic groups in Italy
Islam in Italy
Muslim communities in Europe